Bishoy Chalachchitra is a collection of writings on films by the acclaimed film director Satyajit Ray. The book is in Bengali and was published by Ananda Publishers.

References

Books about film
Books by Satyajit Ray